The Sherbet Collection is a compilation album by Australian band Sherbet released in November 1976. The album reached number 5 on the Kent Music Report of Australia and number 8 on the Recorded Music NZ chart.

Track listing

Chart positions

Release history

References

Sherbet (band) compilation albums
1976 compilation albums
Festival Records compilation albums
Albums produced by Richard Lush
Albums produced by Clive Shakespeare
Albums produced by Garth Porter